FIBA Africa is a zone within the FIBA basketball association which contains all 54 national African FIBA federations. It was founded in 1961. FIBA Africa maintains offices in Cairo and in Abidjan.

Members

FIBA World Rankings

Overview

FIBA Africa competitions

National teams
AfroBasket
AfroBasket Women
FIBA Africa Nations League
AfroCan
 Youth championships
FIBA Africa Under-18 Championship
FIBA Africa Under-18 Championship for Women
FIBA Africa Under-16 Championship
FIBA Africa Under-16 Championship for Women

Clubs
Basketball Africa League
FIBA Africa Women's Clubs Champions Cup
Former competitions
FIBA Africa Basketball League
African Basketball Cup Winners' Cup

Current champions

Nations

3×3 Africa Cup

Clubs

Summer Olympics record

Men

Women

World Championship record

Men

Women

See also
Sport in Africa
Basketball in Africa

References

External links

FIBA AFRICA WEBSITE

1961 establishments in Egypt
Sports organizations established in 1961
Bas
Africa
Basketball in Africa
Sport in Abidjan
Organisations based in Cairo